Juan Antonio Scasso (14 January 1892 - 2 October 1973) was a Uruguayan architect and urbanist.

He was also an association football leader at C.A. Peñarol, of which he was chairman.

Works
 Escuela Experimental de Malvín (1927)
 Estadio Centenario (1930)
 Hotel Miramar (1935)
 Urban expansion of La Paloma, Rocha (1946)

References

1892 births
1973 deaths
Uruguayan people of Italian descent
University of the Republic (Uruguay) alumni
Uruguayan architects
Uruguayan urban planners
Academic staff of the University of the Republic (Uruguay)
Uruguayan football chairmen and investors